FNO may refer to:

 Finance Norway
 Santa Fe Passenger Depot (Fresno, California), Amtrak code FNO
 Nitrosyl fluoride
Friday Night Ops